The M115 anti-crop bomb, also known as the feather bomb or the E73 bomb, was a U.S. biological cluster bomb designed to deliver wheat stem rust.

History
Mass production of the M115 bomb began in 1953. The weapon was a modified M16A1 cluster bomb, which was normally used to distribute airborne leaflet propaganda or fragmentation weapons. The U.S. Air Force first pointed out the need for an anti-crop weapon in September 1947. In October 1950 the Air Force began procuring 4,800 M115 bombs. By 1954, with the biological agents causing wheat and rye rust standardized in laboratory culture, the U.S. Air Force prepared to transfer the agent to some 4,800 of the M115s. The deployment of the M115 represented the United States' first, though limited, anti-crop biological warfare (BW) capability. Though the weapon was tested at Fort Detrick, in Frederick, Maryland, it was never used in combat.

Specifications
The M115 was a  bomb that was converted from a leaflet bomb and to be used to deliver wheat stem rust. Wheat stem rust culture consisted of a dry particulate matter which was adhered to a light-weight vector, usually feathers. Because of its method of dissemination, the bomb was commonly referred to as the "feather bomb". The feathers would fall over a wide area when released. The M115 was shown to establish 100,000 foci of infection over a  area.

Tests involving the M115
The area consisted of  plots sown with the Overland variety of oats, susceptible to the test agent, Puccinia graminis avenae, but not to other strains of cereal rust. Three M115 feather bombs were dropped
 upwind from the target area, which was then monitored for any changes. Estimates showed about a 30% reduction in yield from the infected area.

See also
E77 balloon bomb
M33 cluster bomb

References

Biological weapon delivery systems
Cold War aerial bombs of the United States
Cluster munition
Biological anti-agriculture weapons